Christiane Geras (née Berger; born 3 April 1987) is a German retired figure skater. She is the 2006–07 German national silver medalist and competed at four ISU Figure Skating Championships. Her best result was 14th at the 2001 World Junior Championships.

Personal life
Christiane Geras was born in Ludwigshafen, Germany. Following her Abitur, she started studying dentistry at Goethe University Frankfurt in the autumn of 2006 and consequently graduated in 2011. After her graduation, she worked as a dentist and instructor at Carolinum Dental University Institute at Goethe University Frankfurt until her move to Canada in 2018. Christiane Geras is married. She resides and practices as a dentist in Cobourg, Ontario, Canada.

Skating career
Geras started skating at the age of seven. She trained in Mannheim and represented the Mannheimer ERC.

Geras was selected to represent Germany at the 2001 World Junior Championships in Sofia, Bulgaria; she reached the free skate and finished 14th overall. She was eliminated after the qualifying round at the 2002 World Junior Championships in Hamar, Norway.

Geras was off the ice for half a year in 2003 due to a broken foot. She was coached by Peter Sczypa until 2004, when she switched to Karin Stephan. In the 2004–05 season, she won her first senior national medal, bronze, and took silver the next two years. In 2007, she was sent to the European Championships in Warsaw, Poland. Ranked 17th in the short program, she qualified for the free skate and finished 20th overall.

Geras had to sit out the 2007–08 season due to a broken ankle that required surgery. Due to her injury, Christiane Geras had to end her professional figure skating career.

Programs

Competitive highlights
JGP: Junior Grand Prix

References

External links

 

1987 births
Living people
German female single skaters
Sportspeople from Ludwigshafen